Glaucocharis electra is a moth in the family Crambidae. It was described by Stanisław Błeszyński in 1965. It is found in Zhejiang, China.

References

Diptychophorini
Moths described in 1965